The Atlas Six is a fantasy novel by author Olivie Blake. It is the first of a trilogy and follows six powerful young magic users who have the chance to join the secretive Alexandrian Society. The novel was originally self-published via Kindle in early 2020 before it was acquired by Tor Books after a seven-way auction. It was revised and published by Tor in 2021. The second book of the trilogy, The Atlas Paradox, was released in October 2022.

The Atlas Six was noted for being a viral "BookTok sensation" with a larger "cult following" gained on after Blake's self-publication.

Reception 
The Atlas Six debuted at number three on The New York Times Bestsellers List.

In December 2021, Deadline reported that Amazon Studios has outbid other studios for the small-screen rights to The Atlas Six. Amazon was said to be developing a streaming television series adaptation with Brightstar. Blake will executive produce the series.

References

2020 American novels
2020 fantasy novels
American fantasy novels